Paragoniates alburnus is a species of characin found in the Amazon River basin in Brazil, Peru, and Venezuela.  It is also found as an aquarium fish.  It is the only member of its genus.

References
 

Characidae
Monotypic fish genera
Fish of South America
Fish of Brazil
Fish of Peru
Fish described in 1876